Per Vari Kerloc'h (born 1952) is the current Grand Druid of the Goursez Breizh (founded in 1899). He was born at Douarnenez, in the western part of Brittany. The Grand Druid is appointed for life (Kerloc'h succeeded his predecessor Gwenc'hlan Le Scouëzec), whereas the Welsh and Cornish equivalents are now elected every three years. Kerloc'h has been a middle manager and trade union representative with La Poste. He is a native Breton speaker and a fluent speaker of Cornish. His bardic name is Morgan.

Per Vari Kerloc'h was welcomed at the Welsh National Eisteddfod in Cardiff (Kerdiz in Breton) in 2008. An article in English published in the newspaper "Connexion" explains that after 2 years as a disciple, it is possible to become an Ovate, Bard or Druid, as in Wales. This is different from Gorseth Kernow which has one order, Bards, and a Grand Bard who is elected for just one 3-year period. Goursez Breizh has members who are Christian, Jewish or atheist; on the principle that anyone living in Brittany is Breton. However there are hopes that a younger new leader, rooted in Breton language culture will refocus the Goursez on Breton cultural matters as was the original intent of the movement.

References
Gorseth Kernow (contains frequent news on the Breton Gorsedd written in English and Cornish)

Bibliography
 Hanes Gorsedd y Beirdd (authoritative chapter on the Breton Gorsedd written in Welsh). Barddas, 1991.

1952 births
Living people
People from Douarnenez
Neo-druids
French modern pagans
Modern pagan writers